Jafar Ali Hocha is a Pakistani politician who was a Member of the Provincial Assembly of the Punjab, from May 2013 to May 2018 and from October 2018 to January 2023.

Early life and education
He was born on 9 September 1979 in Faisalabad.

He graduated from Government College of Science and has a degree of Bachelor of Arts.

Political career

He was elected to the Provincial Assembly of the Punjab as a candidate of Pakistan Muslim League (N) (PML-N) from Constituency PP-57 (Faisalabad-VII) in 2013 Pakistani general election.

He was re-elected to the Provincial Assembly of the Punjab as a candidate of PML-N from Constituency PP-103 (Faisalabad-VII) in by-election held on 14 October 2018.

References

Living people
Punjab MPAs 2013–2018
1979 births
Pakistan Muslim League (N) politicians
Politicians from Faisalabad